Lamia Moubayed Bissat  (born in 1967, Beirut) is a Lebanese public servant. She has been serving as President of the Institut des Finances Basil Fuleihan since 2000. In 2018, the United Nations Committee of Experts on Public Administration selected Lamia Moubayed Bissat among the 24 experts to guide members of CEPA on the agenda of 2030.

Early life and education 
Lamia Moubayed Bissat was born on March 27, 1967 in Beirut, Lebanon. Most of Moubayed's childhood was marked by the Lebanese Civil War, which she considers as one of the factors that shaped her professional life. Moubayed became co-founder and volunteer of Green line  in 1991, the first non-governmental organization (NGO) in Lebanon addressing environmental and agricultural development.

Lamia Moubayed Bissat graduated with an engineering degree in agriculture in 1988 and received her master's degree in Agricultural Economics and Development from the American University of Beirut (AUB) in 1990. Eight years later, she joined l'Ecole Supérieure des Affaires in Beirut to pursue a master's in business administration (MBA).

Career 
In 1992, Moubayed began her career by joining as a researcher, the Consultation and Research Institute in Lebanon (CRI), a firm specialized in business consultation and quantitative and qualitative field studies regarding social and economic development in Lebanon and the MENA region. In 1995, Lamia Moubayed joined the United Nations Development Program (UNDP) in Beirut as a program officer. In July 1999, Lamia Moubayed joined the United Nations Economic and Social Commission for West Asia (ESCWA) under the jurisdiction of the United Nations Economic and Social Council (ECOSOC).

In 2000, the French Ministry of Economy and Finance selected and appointed Lamia Moubayed Bissat to become head and director of the Institut des Finances Basil Fuleihan in Lebanon. Moubayed led its transition from a bilateral initiative to a financially and administratively autonomous public service agency within the Lebanese ministry of finance. The institute is today a provider of knowledge in public financial management and state modernization in Lebanon and the MENA region.

Lamia Moubayed lectures public management at the Institute of Political Sciences of Université Saint Joseph in Beirut (Sciences-Po).

On 1 January 2018, Lamia Moubayed was appointed by the United Nations Secretary General Antonio Guterres for a four-year term to serve as one of the twenty-four experts composing UNCEPA. Moubayed is also a fervent supporter of enhancing capacity building in the public procurement unit. In 2020, she took part in the launch of the 2020 United Nations E-Government Survey organized by the UN Department of Economic and Social Affairs, which includes an in-depth presentation of the E-government survey data and results.

Moubayed Bissat is a founding and a secretariat member through the Institute of Finance, of the GIFT-MENA network of civil service training schools in the Middle East and North Africa, established in 2006 and currently based in Beirut. She also contributed to founding the MENAPAR network of research in public administration, currently based in Bahrain.

Lamia Moubayed inaugurated a public library that includes more than twenty-three thousand references accessible to the public and initiated a series of citizen guides to increase awareness on public financial management issues and facilitate citizen transactions entitled "Fiscal and Financial Awareness Series".

In an interview with Le commerce du Levant, Lamia Moubayed highlighted that "stating that the responsibility to conduct or shape public governmental action is only restrained in the hands of the state and its bureaucracies has become obsolete. Today, civil society organizations and the private sector are equally accountable and involved in the process".

Moubayed is a strong proponent of gender equality and strives for the elimination of all forms of discrimination against women. In an interview with Executive Magazine, she explained that "it is important to understand that feminism coupled with empowering women does not come at the expense of men. Indeed, both are eminently required and recommended in order to produce an adequate outcome in a public institution".

Memberships 
Starting 2016, Moubayed became the representative of Lebanon and MENA countries on the board of the “International Association of Schools and Institutes of Administration (IASIA)

 Founding member – Green line, 1991 – Present.
 Member – American University of Beirut (AUB) Alumni Association, 1996 – Present.
 Member – Engineers and Architects Syndicate, 1996 – Present.
 Member – Network for Innovators in Governance in the Mediterranean Region (INNOVMED), 2003 – Present.
 Chair – Governance of Public Finance component of OECD-MENA initiative, 2009 – Present.
 Founding member – Roads for Life "The Talal Kassem Fund for Post-Accident Care", 2011 – Present.
 Member – World Bank Group Regional Committee of Experts on Public Procurement, April 2013 – Present.

Awards and recognition 

Chevalier de La Légion d’Honneur (July 13, 2015).
Chevalier de l’Ordre National du Mérite (June 4, 2004).
Sana Najjar-Zahr Award for Best Student Performance, American University of Beirut (June 1988).

Publications 

"L'Institut des Finances, 20 ans de cooperation administrative franco-libanaise", L. Moubayed.
"Un réseau des écoles de la fonction publique en méditérranée peut-il servir l'agenda de la gouvernance publique?", L. Moubayed.
 “L’avenir de l’Action Publique: Regards croisées autour de la méditerranée”, L. Moubayed, V. Potier & AB. Yakhlef.
 “From Government to Governance: How Will the Arab Region Meet the Goals of Sustainable Development in the Post 2015 Period?”.
“Building capacities in public financial management in a post-conflict country: A practice from the Ministry of Finance and the Institute of Finance of Lebanon”, I. Ghandour, S. Hatem, L. Moubayed Bissat & C. Rihan.
 “Lebanon’s Experiment with Installing Competitive Recruitment”, L. Moubayed Bissat, S. Hatem & C. Rihan.
 “Why Civil Service Reform is Inevitable in Times of Crisis”, L. Moubayed Bissat.
 “Introducing a Gender-Driven Approach to Performance Budgeting: Austria”, L. Moubayed Bissat & M. Bsaibes.
 “Measuring the Public Sector Wage Bill”, L. Moubayed Bissat & I. Ghandour.
"The role of civil society in Rural Community Development: Two case studies from Lebanon”.
 “Rural Community Development through Strengthening Institution Building: Two Case Studies from Lebanon”.
 "Citizen Budget 2018", Institut des Finances Basil Fuleihan. 
 "Citizen Budget 2019", Institut des Finances Basil Fuleihan.
 "Citizen Budget 2020", Institut des Finances Basil Fuleihan.
 "The Economic Cost of Policy Action against the Outbreak Scenarios of Covid-19 in Lebanon", Institut des Finances Basil Fuleihan.
 "The economic and fiscal policies in the Era of Riad El Solh", Institut des Finances Basil Fuleihan.
 "L'approche par competences peut-elle changer l’avenir de la Fonction Publique Libanaise?"

Further reading 

 Muriel de Saint Sauveur (November 21, 2014). A Women's World, a Better World? L'Archipel. P. 98, 119 - 120.

External links 
 Institut des Finances Basil Fuleihan
 GIFT-MENA 
 Ministry of Finance in Lebanon

References 

1967 births
Academic staff of Saint Joseph University
Living people